Sophia Martineck (born 1981, Naumburg, East Germany ) is a German illustrator, designer and comics artist.

Life
Martineck studied visual communication and illustration in Berlin, New York City and Liverpool and graduated in 2007. Since then she has worked as a freelance illustrator and comics artist and has received the Hans-Meid-Förderpreis and the Art Directors Club Young Guns Award for her work. Martineck's work has been noted for its "subtle, blocky and gorgeously detailed illustrations" and has been featured in numerous international publications including The New Yorker, The Financial Times and Le Monde.  Martineck has received particular attention in the United States for her depictions of city life in New York, which Priscilla Frank has noted, "perfectly capture that overwhelmed posture of a little kid in a big city."  In an interview with German television station ZDF, Martineck stressed her preference for the isometric (or 45 degree angle) point of view, which gives her drawings the feeling that the viewer is in the air overlooking an entire city.  Her debut work Hühner, Porno, Schlägerei [Chickens, Porno, Brawl], published 2012 by Avant Verlag, examines the changing working conditions and lifestyles of rural agricultural communities and is based on true stories, although the names and locations are fictionalized.

Selected works
 Hühner, Porno, Schlägerei. 2012. .
 Die Fliege. 2013. .
 Classics Reimagined: The Adventures of Sherlock Holmes. 2014. .

References

1981 births
Living people
German graphic designers
Women graphic designers
German cartoonists
German women cartoonists
German women illustrators
21st-century German artists
21st-century German women